The 1968 Daytona 500 was a NASCAR Grand National Series race held on February 25, 1968, at Daytona International Speedway in Daytona Beach, Florida. Cale Yarborough won the race from the pole

Summary
The event was won by Cale Yarborough driving a 1968 Mercury. Yarborough drove his #21 to victory in just over 3 hours and 23 minutes after starting the race on the pole. There were 11 caution flags which slowed the race for 60 laps, a track record at the time that remained so until 2005.  Yarborough squeaked out the victory by less than a second over LeeRoy Yarbrough.  The win was Yarborough's first victory of the season and his first victory in the "Great American Race".

This was also the only Daytona 500 where the grid was set exclusively by qualifying times. The 125-mile qualifying races were not held due to inclement weather.

First Daytona 500 starts for Andy Hampton, Buddy Arrington, Bill Seifert, Dave Marcis, (Marcis would make every Daytona 500 until 2000), Earl Brooks, Dick Johnson, Dr. Don Tarr, and Dub Simpson. Only Daytona 500 starts for Al Unser, Bob Senneker, Butch Hartman, Larry Manning, Rod Eulenfeld, Charles Burnett, Don Biederman, Stan Meserve, and Bud Moore. Last Daytona 500 starts for Darel Dieringer, Clyde Lynn, Sam McQuagg, Mario Andretti, Sonny Hutchins, Bob Cooper, Jerry Grant, Paul Lewis, Roy Tyner, and H. B. Bailey.

This was the race in which Junior Johnson cost his own team the race. Cale ran out of gas at some point in the race and overshot his pit as the crew wasn't expecting him. Junior Johnson was standing out waiting for Leeroy to come and he managed to put just enough gas to get Cale back around to his put.

Al Unser led a lap in this one; it became the only time that he led a NASCAR race in his career. Dub Simpson earned a dubious distinction by becoming the only driver ever to fail to complete a lap in the race. This was also Bob "The Sneaker" Senneker's best career NASCAR finish, where he finished in 13th place. Richard Petty and his "mysterious" black vinyl roof actually ran pretty good and led the race until James Hylton blew a tire and ended up in the turn 1 wall. A piece of debris from Hylton's car hit Petty's and knocked the roof loose starting a day of troubles for Richard's team because of their experiment. Petty would finish the race two laps behind the drivers on the lead lap.

The transition to purpose-built racecars began in the early 1960s and occurred gradually over that decade.  Changes made to the sport by the late 1960s brought an end to the "strictly stock" vehicles of the 1950s.

References 

Daytona 500
Daytona 500
NASCAR races at Daytona International Speedway